"Starfuckers, Inc." (known as "Starsuckers, Inc." in its censored form) is a song by American industrial rock band Nine Inch Nails from their third studio album The Fragile. Although the song does not have an official halo (the numbering system used by Nine Inch Nails for each release), an edited single was distributed with exclusive radio edits and a video for the song was produced.

Background
Written by Trent Reznor and Charlie Clouser, "Starfuckers, Inc." is one of the heaviest songs on The Fragile. The chorus is built on heavy metal guitars and choruses shouted by a crowd. The verses feature breakbeats, deep bass hits, and glitchy vocals. The outro introduces more synthesizers, distortion, and sound effects.

"Starfuckers, Inc." deals with the self-involved vanity and shallow commercialization of fame. The song directly references "You're So Vain", Carly Simon's ode to a self-absorbed lover, by quoting the chorus:

These lyrics were changed for the video version of "Starsuckers, Inc." to:

The lyrics are speculated to be directed towards Marilyn Manson and Courtney Love. In a 2017 interview on The Howard Stern Show, Manson openly claimed that Reznor wrote the song about him after a heated incident between the two, though they renewed their friendship in time for Manson to co-direct and appear in the music video. "When I wrote the song," Reznor confirmed in 2000, "he was definitely one of the people I had in mind."

The word "Starfucker" may have been taken from The Rolling Stones' song "Star Star" (original title "Starfucker"), which appeared on their 1973 album Goats Head Soup, or more likely from the song "Professional Widow"—also rumoured to be about Love—by Tori Amos, to whom Reznor was close prior to what he refers to as "some malicious meddling on the part of [Love]".

"If certain people do certain things, which cross a line of what is decent, I don't deal with them anymore," Reznor observed in 1999. "With Manson, that line has been crossed. He said some very ignorant, mean, malicious things… On that tour, I was peripherally involved as an observer, and suddenly I'm pictured as the ringleader."

The song was nominated for the Grammy Award for Best Metal Performance in 2000, but lost to Black Sabbath's live rendition of "Iron Man".

Release
"Starsuckers, Inc." was released as a promotional three-track CD in the United States.  It contains the original track, a radio edit in which the word "starfuckers" is replaced by the less-profane "Starsuckers", and the audio of the "Starsuckers, Inc." video with additional changes in lyrics. Its Nothing Records catalog number is INTR-10079-2.

An extended version of "Starfuckers, Inc." was also included as a B-side to the first single from The Fragile, "The Day the World Went Away".

Music video

The music video for "Starfuckers, Inc." was directed by Robert Hales and Marilyn Manson, and revolves around the same themes as the song, albeit in a darkly humorous manner. Under cover of darkness, Reznor and a blonde woman ride in a limousine to a deserted carnival. With the blonde videotaping his antics, Reznor throws baseballs at images of musicians such as Michael Stipe, Billy Corgan, Fred Durst, and even Reznor himself. The theme of "breaking images" recurs throughout the video.

Images of other musicians throughout the video refer, in part, to a story about Reznor in Spin in 1997: "Unlike many musicians, Reznor is savagely aware of his place in the current strata of pop stars. He constantly compares himself to other musicians, saying that he 'can't write a thousand songs like Billy Corgan,' that he's 'not as careerist as [Marilyn] Manson,' that he 'can't sing about [his] big dick like David Lee Roth.'" Images of Corgan, Manson and Roth, among others, appear throughout the video. At the end of the video, the blonde woman pulls off her wig to reveal herself as Manson.

Viewers took Manson's appearance in the video as a sign that Reznor and Manson had renewed their friendship. Manson sang "Starfuckers, Inc." live with the band once, a video recording of which is an easter egg on the And All that Could Have Been DVD.

Reznor said, "(Manson) called me and said, 'You know what, I'm fucking sick of people asking if this song is about me, so I've got a really cool idea for a video that'll just fuck with everybody… We were just poking fun at that bloated sense of celebrity and inflated ego among this clique of royalty in America… But I don't have a problem with Billy Corgan or Stipe or any of the people in the video – with the exception of Courtney Love."

Track listings
UK promotional 12" single
A. "Starfuckers, Inc." – 5:00
B. "The Day the World Went Away" (Porter Ricks Remix) – 7:02

US promotional CD single
"Starsuckers, Inc." – 4:13
"Starfuckers, Inc." – 4:06
"Starsuckers, Inc." (video version) – 4:18

German promotional CD single
"Starsuckers" – 5:01

Charts

References

1999 songs
Music videos directed by Robert Hales
Nine Inch Nails songs
Song recordings produced by Alan Moulder
Song recordings produced by Trent Reznor
Songs about actors
Songs about music
Songs about musicians
Songs written by Charlie Clouser
Songs written by Trent Reznor
Songs about fame